Bo Ancker, (26 April 1926 – 10 October 1997) was a Swedish author and reporter. He was a culture reporter at Sveriges Radio between 1952 and 1989.

Bibliography
1947 – Det stora reportaget : en bok för pojkar
1948 – Spöktåget
1954 – Vi på vinden
1959 – Ge mig en chans!
1965 – Bortom stadens yttersta staket
1965 – Mormors porter : Stockholmsminnen från 20-talet
1967 – I sommarstaden : en bok om Stockholm
1970 – Vaktparaden kommer! : en taktfast rapsodi
1972 – Stockholm 1940 : en autentisk rapsodi genom ett kritiskt och händelserikt år 
1974 – Ett litet stycke Stockholm : en rapsodi kring Adolf Fredriks församling och de tvåhundra åren 1774–1974 
1977 – 21 promenader i Stockholm. D. 1, Innerstaden 
1978 – Turkiska paviljongen : berättelser från Stockholm med omnejd 
1979 – 21 promenader i Stockholm. D. 2, Utkanter : i de närmaste omgivningarna 
1980 – 21 promenader i Stockholm. D. 3, Vattenvägar : på och utmed våra vattenvägar 
1981 – I radions kvarter 
1982 – Mörka kroken : berättelser 
1988 – Lykttändarens dotter 
1989 – Se Skottland : en reseguide 
1995 – I hjärtat av Klara

References

1926 births
1997 deaths
Writers from Stockholm
Swedish writers